The Kongu Arts and Science College is an arts and science college in Nanjanapuram, Erode, Tamil Nadu, India, founded in 1994.  The college is managed by a Trust, which also includes Kongu Engineering College, Kongu Polytechnic College, Kongu Industrial Training Center, and the Kongu National Matriculation Hr. School.

The Kongu Arts and Science College is an educational institution in Erode, re-accredited by NAAC (2013), offering programmes in the arts and science stream. It is a co-educational institution affiliated to Bharathiar University, Coimbatore,  and is run by the Kongu Vellalar Institute of Technology Trust, Perundurai. It is an autonomous from the year 2016. The trust has secured the approval of the Government of Tamil Nadu and of the Bharathiar University. The professional courses offered have been approved by the AICTE (All India Council for Technical Education). The college has an area of 27.24 acres  with a student strength of around 4600 and a staff strength of around 200.

History

The Kongu Vellalar Institute of Technology Trust was founded on 5 October 1983 by forty one philanthropists of Kongu Vellalar Community. The institutions established by the Trust are Kongu Polytechnic College in 1983, Kongu Engineering College in 1984, Kongu Arts and Science College in 1994, Kongu Industrial Training Center in 1997 and Kongu National Matriculation Higher Secondary School in 2002. All the institutions are diligently marching forward towards the pinnacle of glory by their remarkable achievements and laurels in the diverse fields of education.

Academic departments 
 Languages
 Tamil
 English
 Hindi

 Science
 PG Computer Science
 UG Computer Science
 Computer Applications
 Computer Tech. & Information Tech.
 Mathematics
 Costume Design & Fashion
 Biochemistry
 Biotechnology
 Catering Science & Hotel Management
 Physics
 Psychology

 Humanities
 Management Science PG
 Business Administration
 Business Administration (CA) 
 Commerce
 Commerce CA
 Corporate Secretaryship
 Professional Accounting
 Social Work
 Banking and Insurance

External links
 Official website

Universities and colleges in Erode district
Education in Erode
Educational institutions established in 1994
1994 establishments in Tamil Nadu